SS Orcades was built in Germany and launched as Prinz Ludwig. Served on routes to Asia until laid up in Germany during the 1914-1918 War. As part of war reparations Prinz Ludwig came under control of the British Shipping Controller in 1919 and was used for troop repatriations to Australia.

Prinz Ludwig was purchased by the Orient Steam Navigation Company (Orient Line) in 1921, underwent refit and was renamed Orcades. The vessel then served on the UK-Australia route until 1924.

Orcades is an ancient name for the Orkney Islands.

Notes

References
 Drechsel, Edwin (c1994) Norddeutscher Lloyd, Bremen, 1857-1970, vol.1, Cordillera Publishing Company 
 Haws, Duncan (c.1978) Merchant fleets in profile, vol.1, P. Stephens 
 Latimer, David W (2002) Passenger ships of the 20th century: an illustrated encyclopedia, p. 259, Colourpoint Books 
 Picture Australia

Cruise ships
Ships of the Orient Line
Passenger ships of the United Kingdom
Passenger ships of Germany
Ships of Norddeutscher Lloyd
1906 ships
Ships built in Stettin